The women's singles tennis event of the 2019 Pan American Games was held from July 29 through August 4 at the Club Lawn Tennis de La Exposcicion in Lima, Peru.

Nadia Podoroska of Argentina won the gold medal, defeating Caroline Dolehide of the United States in the final, 2–6, 6–3, 7–6(7–4).

Verónica Cepede Royg of Paraguay, won the bronze medal, defeating Carolina Alves of Brazil in the bronze-medal match, 6–3, 6–4.

Seeds

Draw

Finals

Top half

Bottom half

References
 Draw

Women's Singles